Thattummal is a place in Kasaragod District of Kerala, India. This town lies on SH 56 - the major road which connects Kanhangad and Panathur and has a limited bus stop. Thattummal is considered as the doorway to highrange areas of kanhangad

Location 
Thattummal lies in between of kannur to payyannur state highway and is 16 km far from cherupuzha. Nearby towns are padiyottuchal and thattummal.

Educational institutions 
 ghss vayakkara

References

Cities and towns in Kasaragod district